The 2010 Wyre Forest District Council election took place on 6 May 2010 to elect members of Wyre Forest District Council in Worcestershire, England. One third of the council was up for election and the Conservative Party gained overall control of the council from no overall control.

After the election, the composition of the council was:
Conservative 23
Health Concern 8
Liberal 5
Labour 3
Liberal Democrats 2
Independent 1

Election result
Overall turnout at the election was 65.6%.

Ward results

References

2010
2010 English local elections
May 2010 events in the United Kingdom
2010s in Worcestershire